Destin C. Hall is an American attorney and politician who is currently serving in the North Carolina House of Representatives, representing the 87th District.

Early life
Destin Hall was born on July 17, 1987, in Lenoir, North Carolina. He graduated from West Caldwell High School, and went on to earn his bachelor's degree from Appalachian State University, where he double-majored in Finance and Risk Management & Insurance. After his graduation from Appalachian State University in 2009, he earned his J.D. degree from Wake Forest University School of Law. After he graduated in 2014, Hall practiced law in Charlotte, North Carolina, for a year before returning to his hometown of Lenoir. Hall currently lives and practices in Lenoir, North Carolina. He is a bachelor.

Political career
Hall began his political career soon after his return to Caldwell County in 2015 where he became the Treasurer of the Caldwell County Republican Party. In January 2015, the longtime State House Representative Edgar Vance Starnes, who previously held the seat for 20 years, unexpectedly resigned to accept a position with the North Carolina State Treasurer's office. George S. Robinson was appointed to take Starnes's seat in the North Carolina House. Hall announced his campaign for the North Carolina House of Representatives 87th District seat on December 1, 2015. In March 2016, Hall won the Republican Party Primary. Hall won the General Election on November 9, 2016,. He was sworn in as a member of the North Carolina House of Representatives in January 2017. Shortly after, Hall was elected by his peers to be the Majority Freshman Leader of the House Republican Caucus. In 2018 and 2020, Hall was reelected to his seat in the North Carolina House of Representatives.

On August, 3rd 2020 Hall was appointed co-chair of the North Carolina House Committee on Rules, Calendar, and Operations of the House by Speaker Tim Moore. Shortly after Hall's appointment, he was raised to full chairman of the committee following the unexpected resignation of the prior chairman, David R. Lewis.

After being sworn in for his third term, Hall was once again appointed to serve as chairman of the North Carolina House Committee on Rules, Calendar, and Operations of the House by Speaker Tim Moore for the 2021-2022 Legislative Session.

North Carolina House of Representatives

Notable legislation
House Bill 551 – Strengthening Victims' Rights. This bill was based on Marsy's Law, making North Carolina one of several states that have adopted the constitutional amendment. House Bill 551 amended the state constitution to expand the legal rights of crime victims. This constitutional amendment was approved by a majority of North Carolinians in November 2018.

House Bill 370 – House Bill 370 "Require Cooperation with ICE Detainers" would obligate North Carolina's sheriffs to notify  federal immigration agents if the Sheriffs department cannot determine an inmate's legal status in the United States of America, the sheriff's would be obligated to hold inmates already in their custody who are subject to a detainer by I.C.E for up to 48 hours. House Bill 370 passed both chambers of the North Carolina General Assembly but was vetoed by Governor  Roy Cooper on August 21, 2019.

House Bill 218 – House Bill 218, “Broadcast NC House of Reps Sessions" pushed for video coverage at the General Assembly. It was supposed to establish a devoted webcast of daily House sessions and directed that sessions of “particular public importance” should be aired on UNCTV. In 2019, North Carolina was one of seven that did not provide video broadcasts or video webcasts of their legislative sessions to the public. The bill passed through the North Carolina House by a vote of 116–1, however the bill was never passed by the North Carolina Senate. Even though the bill had been stopped in the Senate Rules Committee, Speaker of The House Tim Moore directed that the North Carolina House of Representatives would broadcast its legislative sessions by video via web streaming services. The video broadcasts began in April 2020.

This video system was implemented at the time when it was most useful. The COVID-19 outbreak increased public interest in legislative issues, and the new video system allowed for North Carolinians to tune in to the legislative sessions of the North Carolina House of Representatives.

Committee assignments
Standing or select committees (2017–2018 Session)
 Banking
 Commerce
 Elections and Ethics Law
 Education K-12
 Finance
 Insurance
 Judiciary II

Standing or select committees (2019–2020 Session)
 Redistricting Committee, Chairman 
 Elections and Ethics Law, Chairman 
 Judiciary Subcommittee on Criminal Matters, Chairman 
 Joint Select Committee on Congressional Redistricting, Co-Chairman 
 Commerce
 Energy and Public Utilities
 Finance
 Insurance

Standing or select committees (2021–2022 Session)
 Rules, Calendar, and Operations of the House Chairman
 Redistricting Chairman 
 Energy and Public Utilities
 Finance

Standing or select committees (2023–2024 Session)
 Rules, Calendar, and Operations of the House Chairman
 Redistricting Chairman 
 Energy and Public Utilities
 Finance

Electoral history

2022

2020

2018

2016

References

1987 births
Living people
People from Lenoir, North Carolina
People from Granite Falls, North Carolina
Appalachian State University alumni
Wake Forest University School of Law alumni
American lawyers
North Carolina lawyers
21st-century American politicians
Republican Party members of the North Carolina House of Representatives